Braz Roberto da Costa (born 1961), known professionally as Braz da Viola, is a Brazilian multi-instrumentalist musician, luthier,  conductor and teacher. He runs workshops of viola caipira in several cities in Brazil. He played with several guitar players in Brazil, such as Roberto Corrêa, Paulo Freire, Renato Andrade, Pereira da Viola, Ivan Vilela and dual Zé Mulato and Cassiano. He worked with Inezita Barroso, when the singer appeared accompanied by the Orquestra de Viola Caipira de São José dos Campos.

Biography
He began playing guitar at age 15. He was introduced to the guitar by his uncle, Braz Aparecido, broadcaster and composer, who has recorded works by Tonic and Tinoco, Vieira and Vieirinha and Liu and Léu. He learned to play guitar with Dean Barioni. In 1991, he founded the Orquestra de Viola Caipira de São José dos Campos in order to publicize and popularize the viola caipira and also to organize viola players.  He is conductor of that orchestra. In 1999, he developed works for the dissemination and popularization of the viola with the Orchestra Viola de Coité. That same year he founded "Viola Serena" in Itamonte - MG. In August 2006, he was one of Brazil's representatives at the Festival of World Cultures in Dublin, Ireland.

Lutenist

He learned the craft of building viola caipira from Renato Vieira, factory of violas Xadrez. In 1994, deployed two lutenist of viola workshops in Sao Jose dos Campos and São Francisco Xavier. Currently he is building violas de cocho in his own atelier, a typical instrument of the Brazilian Pantanal.

Discography

 1994 - Paraiba vivo, o rio da minha terra - with the Orquesta de Viola Caipira
 1995 - Modas e violas do vale - with the Orquesta de Viola Caipira
 1996 - Crisálida - with Roberto Corrêa and Orquestra Juvenil
 1997 - Clarão do luar
 1998 - Violeiros do Brasil - Various artists
 1998 - Feito na Roça - with the Orquesta de Viola Caipira
 2000 - Festa no Lugar - with the Orquesta de Viola Caipira
 2001 - Florescê
 2001 - Viola de Coité - with the Orquesta de Viola Caipira from Londrina

References

External links
 

1961 births
Living people
Brazilian composers
Brazilian lutenists
Brazilian multi-instrumentalists